In 1888, the Conservatives won the mayor's position in the municipality for the first time. Since then, the Conservatives had held it. In 2017 they won their 33rd consecutive term, and Hans Toft his 7th term. However, he would not stand in this election.

Despite a new candidate from the Conservatives, they would still win a comfortable absolute majority. They lost 1 seat, but still won 12 of the 19 seats (63.2%). It would be the municipality where they won the highest % of votes, and also the third highest vote share for a party in the 2017 Danish local elections. With 12 seats, Michael Fenger, the new Conservative candidate, was set to become the mayor.

Electoral system
For elections to Danish municipalities, a number varying from 9 to 31 are chosen to be elected to the municipal council. The seats are then allocated using the D'Hondt method and a closed list proportional representation.
Gentofte Municipality had 19 seats in 2021

Unlike in Danish General Elections, in elections to municipal councils, electoral alliances are allowed.

Electoral alliances  

Electoral Alliance 1

Electoral Alliance 2

Electoral Alliance 3

Results

Notes

References 

Gentofte